The Angry Mountain is a 1950 thriller novel by the British writer Hammond Innes. An Englishman still tortured by his wartime experiences, gets drawn into intrigue in Czechoslovakia and Italy.

Innes was in San Sebastiano when Vesuvius erupted and lava rolled over the village.

References

Bibliography
 James Vinson & D. L. Kirkpatrick. Contemporary Novelists. St. James Press, 1986.

1950 British novels
Novels by Hammond Innes
British thriller novels
Novels set in Italy
Novels set in Czechoslovakia
William Collins, Sons books